Ku! Kin-dza-dza (rus. Ку! Кин-дза-дза) is a 2013 Russian animated science fiction film by Georgy Danelia. It is an animated remake of Danelia's 1986 live-action film Kin-dza-dza!. Although it preserves much of the original movie's social commentary, Ku! Kin-dza-dza is notably less dark and dystopian than original, and more targeted towards youth and an international audience.  The film is mainly traditionally animated with some computer animation in it.

Plot
The remake follows the plot of the original with minor changes. While the original story was set in 1980s, the remake is set in 2010s, some of the scenes were altered, and the two new protagonists are different from their 1986 counterparts.

A renowned cellist Vladimir Chizhov (Uncle Vova) and his teenage nephew Tolik meet an alien with a teleportation device. Tolik carelessly pushes a button on the device, and he and Uncle Vova are beamed to the planet Plyuk in Kin-dza-dza galaxy. The planet is a post-apocalyptic desert without resources, ruled by a brutal racist regime. The two travellers meet three locals, Bi, Wef and their robot Abradox, who travel on a pepelats and constantly try to cheat and betray the naive newcomers. Tolik and Uncle Vova have to go a long distance through the rusting world of Kin-dza-dza to find their way home.

Cast
 Nikolai Gubenko as Uncle Vova
 Ivan Tsekhmistrenko as Tolik Tsarapkin
 Andrei Leonov as Wef (son of Yevgeny Leonov, who performed the role in the original movie)
 Alexei Kolgan as Bi and Kyrr
 Aleksandr Adabashyan as Abradox
 Georgy Danelia as Camomile and Diogenes
 Igor Kvasha as Yk, a carousel owner
 Irina Devlyashova as Lidka Liziakina
 Polina Kutepova as Tolik's Мother
 Margarita Rasskazova as Astronomer
 Igor Sannikov as Old Man in a wheelbarrow
 Alla Sannikova as Old Woman in a wheelbarrow
 Victoria Radunskaya as Old Woman in the planetarium
 Vakhtang Kikabidze as Tratz, a leader of the smugglers
 Galina Danelia-Yurkova as Frosya, Uncle Vova's housekeeper

Critical reception
The film was met with generally favorable reviews in Russian media. It holds an average rating of 82 out of 100 at Russian review aggregator Kritikanstvo. Ku! Kin-dza-dza received positive reviews from Russian version of Empire, Mir Fantastiki, Argumenty i Fakty, Rossiyskaya Gazeta, Trud and Izvestiya, and mediocre ratings from Lenta.ru, Vedomosti and Afisha. Outside Russia, Vassilis Kroustallis at Zippyframes gave the film a positive review.

Awards
 Asia Pacific Screen Awards
 Nika Award for best animated feature.

References

External links
 

2013 films
2013 animated films
2010s science fiction comedy films
Remakes of Russian films
Films directed by Georgiy Daneliya
Best Animated Feature Film Asia Pacific Screen Award winners
Russian science fiction comedy films
Russian and Soviet animated science fiction films
Russian animated films
Russian children's fantasy films
2010s Russian-language films